Margaret Heitland (née Bateson;  27 February 1860 – 31 May 1938) was a British journalist and social activist (suffragette).

She was the daughter of William Henry Bateson, master of St John's College, Cambridge.  In 1901 she married William Emerton Heitland,  Classicist and Fellow of St John's.

She was sister of the geneticist William Bateson, whose son was the anthropologist and cyberneticist Gregory Bateson, and sister of the historian, Mary Bateson.

She is buried in the Ascension Parish Burial Ground, Cambridge.

Career 
Margaret, her two sisters, Anna and Mary Bateson, and their mother Anna Aitkin were involved with the Women's suffrage movement. Margaret was interested in journalism which she began pursuing in 1886. She then began working for The Queen where she stayed for the majority of her career. In 1888, she organized a campaign of meetings for the Women's Suffrage Society and in 1895 she published Professional Women upon their Professions: Conversations. In 1913 she became president of the Cambridge Women's Suffrage Association, a member of the National Union of Women's Suffrage Societies Executive committee and vice president of the Central Bureau for the Employment of Women. In 1912, as a member of the National Union of Women's Suffrage Societies, she wrote a letter to Maud Arncliffe Sennett stating that both men and women should have the opportunity to live in better conditions than they did. In 1920, she was a member of the standing committee of the Cambridge Branch of the National Union of Societies for Equal Citizenship still in hopes of political equality.

References

External links
Professional Women Upon Their Professions: Conversations, etext at Archive.org

Further reading
 Peter Searby, ‘Heitland, Margaret (1860–1938)’, Oxford Dictionary of National Biography, Oxford University Press, 2004 accessed 16 March 2013

1860 births
1938 deaths
British suffragists
British women journalists
Bateson family